The Icelandic keyboard layout is a national functional keyboard layout described in ÍST 125, used to write the Icelandic language on computers and typewriters. It is QWERTY-based and features some influences from the continental Nordic layouts. It supports the language's many special letters, some of which it shares with the other Nordic languages:
 Þ/þ, Ð/ð, Æ/æ and Ö/ö (Æ/æ also occurs in Norwegian, Danish and Faroese, Ð/ð in Faroese, and Ö/ö in Swedish, Finnish and Estonian.) These are all entered by pressing dedicated keys    .
 Á/á, É/é, Ý/ý, Ú/ú, Í/í, and Ó/ó are entered by first pressing dead key  located to the right of Æ and then the corresponding key.

Non-Icelandic letters

These letters are not used natively in Icelandic, but may have been implemented for ease of communication in other Nordic languages.

References

Latin-script keyboard layouts